Voluntary childlessness, also called being childfree, describes the voluntary choice to not have children.

In most societies and for most of human history, choosing not to have children was both difficult and undesirable. The availability of reliable contraception along with support provided in old age by one's government rather than one's family has made childlessness an option for some people, though they may be looked down upon in certain communities.

According to the Merriam-Webster Dictionary, the word "childfree" first appeared sometime before 1901, and was described as a 'trend' in 2014 in Psychology Today online magazine.  The meaning of the term "childfree" extends to encompass the children of others (in addition to one's own children) and this distinguishes it further from the more usual term "childless", which is traditionally used to express the idea of having no children, whether by choice or by circumstance. The term "child free" has been cited in Australian literature to refer to parents who are without children at the current time. This may be due to them living elsewhere on a permanent basis or a short-term solution such as childcare.

Reasons cited for being voluntarily childless

Supporters of this lifestyle, such as Corinne Maier, French author of No Kids: 40 Reasons For Not Having Children, cite various reasons for their view.

Personal and social

 Simply not wanting to have children Supporters of this lifestyle argue that they should not have to justify why they do not want children.
Availability of effective contraception or sterilization makes the choice to remain voluntarily childless easier
 Uncertain or ambivalent feelings about having children
Testimonies of parents who regret having children
Positive attitudes and lack of regret of people who chose to not have children
Other possibilities in life opening up due to the lack of children
Lack of desire to perpetuate one's family line or pass on one's genes
 reluctance to replicate the genes of one's own parents in cases of child abuse
 Lack of a suitable partner or difficulty getting married
These trends are important in countries where having children out of wedlock is highly unusual, such as China.
Disapproval of societal treatment and expectations of men and women
General existential angst
Unwillingness to sacrifice freedom and independence to rearing children
unwillingness to give up the current lifestyle
 Being godparents or helping relatives raise their children
 Possible deterioration of interpersonal relationships
 Preference of having a pet over a child
Preference of pursuing personal development to raising children
 refusal to have one's needs and wants subjugated by those of someone else
 Unwillingness to disrupt one's current work and private home life
 career orientation and intellectual pursuits, which may be at odds with parenthood
 preventing long-term disruption of sleep by crying young children at night
 not having to repeatedly clean up a child's mess
 Dislike of (young) children's behavior and/or language
 the view that children are egocentric and difficult to handle
Situation where one's partner already has children from a previous relationship and one does not have a need or justification to bear or father additional children
 Uncertainty over the stability of the parenting relationship, and the damage to relationships or difficulties with them getting children may cause
 partner does not want children
 fear that sexual activity may decline
 a long-term relationship or marriage might be in danger due to the stress created by children
 Possibility of sexual activity without the need, risk, or willingness to get pregnant by using birth control
 Concerns over the effects pregnancy has on the woman's body (weight gain, stretch marks, drooping breasts, hyperpigmentation on the face, looser pelvic muscles leading to reduced sexual pleasure for both the woman and her partner, haemorrhoids, urinary incontinence, death, among others)
 Disapproval of perfectionist attitudes towards child-rearing in modern societies
 As a society becomes better developed, it is generally true that expectations of parental investment per child goes up, depressing fertility rates.
 Dislike of dedicated parents
 In North American English, the (pejorative) term for this is 'soccer moms'.

Psychological and medical

 Pregnancy and childbirth can bring about undesirable changes:
 substantial neurobiological changes leading to postpartum depression, and feelings of insecurity and inadequacy, among other things. Men can also suffer from postpartum depression.
 lasting effects on women's health. In particular, research suggests a causal link between gravidity and accelerated cellular aging, because energy is diverted from somatic maintenance to reproductive efforts.
 The health of one's partner does not allow for children
 Personal well-being, health and happiness
 one's health does not allow for children
 one already has enough problems of one's own
 gap in happiness between parents and the childfree in favor of the latter, even in places with generous social welfare programs
 Existing or possible health problems, including genetic disorders that one does not want potential children to inherit and mental health issues
 Not feeling the 'biological clock' ticking and having no maternal or paternal instincts or drives
 Fear and/or revulsion towards the physical condition of pregnancy (tokophobia), the childbirth experience, and recovery (for example the erosion of physical desirability)
 Celibacy or a fear and/or revulsion towards sexual activity and intimacy
 Various fears (for example, of being trapped or disappointed) as well as fears for the child
 fear of a long-term stressful responsibility and performance anxiety
 fear of not being able to love one's child
 fear that one will give birth to a disabled child and taking care of whom is challenging
 hard to arrange, or pay for, child care
 fear that one's child may grow up to become an immoral person
 fear and/or revulsion towards children
 Perceived or actual incapacity to be a responsible and patient parent
 belief that other people are better suited to have children than oneself
 Belief that one is too old or too young to have children
 Parents can become less empathetic towards non-family members.

Economic and cultural

 Rejection of the claim that the country's economy is at risk if some people do not procreate
 Belief that very few parents actually have children in order to support the country's economy
Burden of taxes and debt
Some use the term "wage slaves" when referring to having to pay taxes to support welfare programs such as pensions.
Student debts, a serious problem among Millennials and Generation Z in the U.S., discourage many from having children.
Stagnant or falling wages at the same time as high cost of living
Rising cost of raising a child as a society industrializes and urbanizes
In an agrarian society, children are a source of labor and thus income for the family. But as it shifts towards industries other than agriculture and as more people relocate to the cities, children become a net sink of parental resources. This is known as the (first) demographic transition.
Being busy with work
 Unwillingness to pay the cost of raising a child. For example, according to Statistics Netherlands and the National Institute for Budgetary Information (Nibud), raising a child cost an average of €120,000 from birth to age 18, or about 17% of one's disposable income as of 2019.
 Inability to pay the cost of raising a child
 Hard to arrange, or pay for, child care
 Parental leaves are non-existent or too short
 Expensive (higher) education
 Not having a support network, especially when one is or risks becoming a single parent
 Living in a time of pestilence or economic recession
 Changing cultural attitude towards children (known as the second demographic transition)
 A result of women's liberation, education, and rising workforce participation
 Women no longer need to marry and bear children in order to be economically secure
 Transition from traditional and communal values towards expressive individualism
 In the West, adherents of the countercultural or feminist movements in the 1960s and 1970s typically had no children
 Growing awareness that childbearing is a choice
 Declining support for traditional gender roles, and that people need to have children in order to be complete or successful
 Unwillingness to burden one's children with such care, or preventing a situation in which one's premature death will orphan one's children (at too young an age), or cause them too much sorrow at one's deathbed
 No need for care by one's own children when one is old or close to dying
 One can be cared for by the modern welfare state (including the establishment of retirement homes)
 Having no children allows one to save more money for retirement.
 Having children is not a guaranteed safety net for parent-child relations might be strained
 Ability to donate one's inheritance to a charity of one's own choice instead of having to divide it amongst one's children
Greater interest in and affordability of pets compared to children

Philosophical

 Ability to invest some of the time and money saved by not raising children to other socially meaningful purposes
 Belief that one can make an even greater contribution to humanity through one's work than through having children (for example by working for or donating to charities)
 The view that the wish to reproduce oneself is a form of narcissism
The opinion that not having children is no more selfish than having them
Some argue that not having children is an unselfish act
Questioning of the need for the next generation and refusal to be 'slaves' to the genes
 Belief that one can better contribute to the welfare of existing people (including children) than to produce even more
 Belief in a negative, declining condition of the world and culture and in the need to avoid subjecting a child to those negative conditions 
This includes concerns that calamitous events—effects of global warming, war, or famine—might be likely to occur within the lifetime of one's children and cause their suffering and/or death
Rejection of the common argument that a woman who does not have children is "missing out" or will be more motivated at some undefined time.
 The view that one's friendships and relationships with adults are sufficient for one's own happiness
 The view that spending time with one's nephews, nieces or stepchildren is sufficient for one's own happiness
Antinatalism, the philosophy asserting that it is inherently immoral to bring people into the world.
Antinatalists argue in favor of the asymmetry of pleasure and pain. The absence of pleasure is neutral whereas the absence of pain is positive. Hence, one may generally wish to spare a potential child from the suffering of life.
Moreover, the parent can never get the consent of the unborn child, therefore a decision to procreate would be an imposition of life. However, some childfree people explicitly reject antinatalism; they may even like the children of others, but just do not want any themselves.
 Belief that one is not 'missing out' on any of the alleged benefits of parenthood as long as one does not know what parenthood is like
 Belief that it is wrong to intentionally have a child when there are so many children available for adoption
 Belief that people tend to have children for the wrong reasons (e.g. fear, social pressures from cultural norms)
 Adherence to the principles of a religious organization which rejects having children or the rejection of procreative religious beliefs imposed by one's family and/or community
 Belief that it is irresponsible to 'just try' what parenthood is like when one is still in doubt, as it burdens one with a responsibility to raise a child to adulthood once it's born, with no turning back when one is disappointed and regrets the decision
 Belief that one can still contribute to 'the education of children to become happy and empathic beings' that a society needs (for example, by being a teacher or babysitter) without being a parent oneself
Opposition to capitalism, believed to necessitate procreation
Opinion that the traditional family is "a decadent, energy-absorbing, destructive, wasteful institution"
This is held by radical feminists.
General discontent with modern society
Perception of the lack of mutual respect, human dignity, and privacy among individuals and institutions in modern societies; loss of faith in humanity
Perception of the inescapable, invasive use of modern technology and global surveillance; anticipation of a technological dystopian future
Social Darwinism and political polarization; general cynicism and existential nihilism

Logical
 Any specific activity requires motivation or justification, not inaction

Environmental

 Rejection of the claim that the survival of the entire human species is at risk if some people do not procreate, especially in times of human overpopulation
Belief that very few parents actually have children in order to prevent human extinction
 View that human existence inflicts suffering upon other species just like the way they cause harm among themselves via predatory practices
 Countering human overpopulation and its effects by not reproducing
 Concern regarding environmental impacts of human activities including population growth such as climate change, global warming, pollution, resource scarcity and famines, humanitarian crises such as refugee crises and resulting ethnic conflicts, loss of biodiversity or mass extinction
 The belief that having one fewer child reduces one's carbon dioxide emissions significantly compared to, for instance, owning a car with improved fuel efficiency, replacing incandescent light bulbs with more energy efficient models, avoiding air travel, practicing comprehensive recycling, or adopting a vegetarian diet
 Worries over the breakdown of civilization
 Opposition to anthropocentrism and belief in deep ecology, or putting non-human lives first
 Support for the eventual extinction of Homo sapiens
 Opinion that the voluntary extinction of humanity will be not entirely a tragedy but an act of empathy and nobility

Statistics and research

General
Psychologist Ellen Walker argued in Psychology Today that the childfree lifestyle had become a trend in 2014. The Internet has enabled people who pursue this lifestyle to connect, thereby making it more visible. Worldwide, higher educated women are statistically more often choosing to remain childless. Research into both voluntary and involuntary childlessness and parenthood has long focused on women's experiences, and men's perspectives are often overlooked.

Asia

China
In China, the cost of living, especially the cost of housing in the big cities, is a serious obstacle to marriage. In the 1990s, the Chinese government reformed higher education in order to increase access, whereupon significantly more young people, a slight majority of whom being women, have received a university degree. Consequently, many young women are now gainfully employed and financially secure. Traditional views on gender roles dictate that women be responsible for housework and childcare, regardless of their employment status. Workplace discrimination against women (with families) is commonplace; for example, an employer might be more skeptical towards a married woman with one child, fearing she might have another (as the one-child policy was rescinded in 2016) and take more maternity leave. Altogether, there is less incentive for young women to marry. In addition, Chinese Millennials are less keen on tying the knots than their predecessors as a result of cultural change. Because this is a country where having children out of wedlock is quite rare, this means that many young people are foregoing children.

The "lying flat" movement, popular among Chinese youths, also extends to the domain of marriage and child-rearing. Over half of Chinese youths aged 18 to 26 said they were uninterested in having children because of the high cost of child-rearing, according to a 2021 poll by the Communist Youth League. While the Chinese economy is steeply rising, explosive bloom of the real-estate market post-2008 has triggered an increase in house prices disproportionate to income and this is the commonly cited reason for childlessness and "lying flat" among the Chinese youth. A normal apartment unit in Beijing (with an average area of 112 square meters), for instance, costs on average ¥7.31 million ($1.15 million) and one would need to work non-stop for at least 88.2 years at Beijing's average monthly income of ¥6906 ($1083.7) without any expenditures to buy.

Indonesia
The author Victoria Tunggono published the book Childfree & Happy in 2021.

Taiwan
In Taiwan, it has become much more affordable for young couples to own pets instead of having children. In addition, those who want children face obstacles such as short maternity leaves and low wages. By 2020, Taiwan has become home to more pets than children.

Vietnam
As Vietnam continues to industrialize and urbanize, many couples have chosen to have fewer children, or not at all, especially in better developed and more densely populated places, such as Ho Chi Minh City, where the fertility rate fell to 1.45 in 2015, well below replacement. Rising cost of living and tiredness from work are among the reasons why.

Europe
In Europe, childlessness among women aged 40–44 is most common in Austria, Spain and the United Kingdom (in 2010-2011). Among surveyed countries, childlessness was least common across Eastern European countries, although one child families are very common there.

Belgium
In March 2020, Quest reported that research had shown that, in Belgium, 11% of women and 16% of men between the ages of 25 and 35 did not want children.

Netherlands

According to research by Statistics Netherlands from 2004, 6 in 10 childless women are voluntarily childless. It showed a correlation between higher levels of education of women and the choice to be childfree, and the fact that women had been receiving better education in the preceding decades was a factor why an increasing number of women chose childfreedom. The two most important reasons for choosing not to have children were that it would infringe on their freedom and that raising children takes too much time and energy; many women who gave the second reason also gave the first. A 2016 report from Statistics Netherlands confirmed those numbers: 20% of Dutch women were childless, of whom 60% voluntarily, so that 12% of all Dutch women could be considered childfree.

In March 2017, Trouw reported that a new Statistics Netherlands report showed that 22% of higher educated 45-year-old men were childless and 33% of lower educated 45-year-old men were childless. Childlessness amongst the latter was increasing, even though most of them were involuntarily childless. The number of voluntarily childless people amongst higher educated men had been increasing since the 1960s, whilst voluntary childlessness amongst lower educated men (who tended to have been raised more traditionally) did not become a rising trend until the 2010s.

In March 2020, Quest reported that research from Trouw and Statistics Netherlands had shown that 10% of 30-year-old Dutch women questioned had not gotten children out of her own choice, and did not expect to get any children anymore either; furthermore, 8.5% of 45-year-old women questioned and 5.5% of 60-year-old women questioned stated that they had consciously remained childless.

Russia
In October 2020, NAFI reported that 7% of population between the ages of 18 and 45 did not want children, this figure reached 20% within Moscow population.
Most often, educated, wealthy and ambitious people refuse to have children. They are unwilling to sacrifice their comfort and career for the sake of their children. 
At the same time, the spread of ideology is prohibited in the country, and the founder of the movement Childfree Russia, Edward Lisovskii, is being persecuted by the government.

Sweden
According to a 2019 study amongst 191 Swedish men aged 20 to 50, 39 were not fathers and did not want to have children in the future either (20.4%). Desire to have (more) children was not related to level of education, country of birth, sexual orientation or relationship status.

Some Swedish men 'passively' choose not to have children as they feel their life is already good as it is, adding children is not necessary, and they do not have to counter the same amount of social pressure to have children as childfree women do.

United Kingdom
A YouGov poll released in January 2020 revealed that among Britons who were not already parents, 37% told pollsters they did not want any children ever. 19% said they did not want children but might change their minds in the future and 26% were interested in having children. Those who did not want to be parents included 13% of people aged 18 to 24, 20% of those aged 25 to 34, and 51% aged 35 to 44. Besides age (23%), the most popular reasons for not having children were the potential impact on lifestyles (10%), high costs of living and raising children (10%), human overpopulation (9%), dislike of children (8%), and lack of parental instincts (6%).

North America

Canada
The BBC reported in 2010 that around half of Canadian women without children in their 40s had decided to not have any from an early age.

United States
Being a childfree American adult was considered unusual in the 1950s. However, the proportion of childfree adults in the population has increased significantly since then. A 2006 study by Abma and Martinez found that American women aged 35 to 44 who were voluntarily childless constituted 5% of all U.S. women in 1982, 8% in 1988, 9% in 1995 and 7% in 2002. These women had the highest income, prior work experience and the lowest religiosity compared to other women. Research by sociologist Kristin Park revealed that childfree people tended to be better educated, to be professionals, to live in urban areas, to be less religious, and to have less conventional life choices.

From 2007 to 2011 the fertility rate in the U.S. declined 9%, the Pew Research Center reporting in 2010 that the birth rate was the lowest in U.S. history and that childlessness rose across all racial and ethnic groups to about 1 in 5 versus 1 in 10 in the 1970s; it did not say which percentage of childless Americans were so voluntarily, but Time claimed that, despite persisting discrimination against especially women who chose to remain childless, acceptance of being childfree was gradually increasing.

According to a cross-generational study comparing millennials to Generation X conducted at Wharton School of Business, more than half of Millennial undergraduates surveyed do not plan to have children. The researchers compared surveys of the Wharton graduating class of 1992 and 2012. In 1992, 78% of women planned to eventually have children dropping to 42% in 2012. The results were similar for male students. The research revealed among both genders the proportion of undergraduates who reported they eventually planned to have children had dropped in half over the course of a generation. A 2021 survey by Pew found that the number of non-parents aged 18 to 49 who said they were not too likely or not at all likely to have children was 44%, up seven points compared to 2018. Among these people, 56% said they simply did not want to have children.

Psychologist Paul Dolan made the case that women who never married or have children are among the happiest subgroup in the United States by analyzing American Time Use Survey. 2019 data from the St. Louis Federal Reserve shows that among single people, women without children made more money than men without children or men and women with children.

Waren and Pals (2013) found that voluntary childlessness in the United States was more common among higher educated women but not higher educated men.

In the U.S., although being voluntarily childless or childfree is not without its disadvantages, such as higher taxes, less affordable housing options, and concern of old age, parenthood continues to lose its appeal.

Oceania

New Zealand
Statistics New Zealand estimated that the share of childfree women grew from under 10% in 1996 to around 15% in 2013. Professional women were the most likely to be without children, at 16%, compared with 12% for manual workers. At least 5% of women were childfree by choice.

Social attitudes to remaining childfree
Most societies place a high value on parenthood in adult life, so that people who remain childfree are sometimes stereotyped as being "individualistic" people who avoid social responsibility and are less prepared to commit themselves to helping others. However, certain groups believe that being childfree is beneficial. With the advent of environmentalism and concerns for stewardship, those choosing to not have children are also sometimes recognized as helping reduce our impact. Some childfree are sometimes lauded on moral grounds, such as members of philosophical or religious groups, like the Shakers.

There are three broad areas of criticism regarding childfreeness, based upon socio-political, feminist or religious reasons. There are also considerations relating to personal philosophy and social roles.

Feminism
Feminist author Daphne DeMarneffe links larger feminist issues to both the devaluation of motherhood in contemporary society, as well as the delegitimization of "maternal desire" and pleasure in motherhood. In third-wave handbook Manifesta: Young Women, Feminism, and the Future, authors Jennifer Baumgardner and Amy Richards explore the concept of third-wave feminists reclaiming "girlie" culture, along with reasons why women of Baby Boomer and Generation X ages may reject motherhood because, at a young and impressionable age, they witnessed their own mothers being devalued by society and family.

On the other hand, in "The Bust Guide to the New Girl Order" and in Utne Reader magazine, third-wave feminist writer Tiffany Lee Brown described the joys and freedoms of childfree living, freedoms such as travel previously associated with males in Western culture. In "Motherhood Lite", she celebrates being an aunt, co-parent, or family friend over the idea of being a mother.

Overpopulation

The human population has grown significantly since the start of industrialization, leading many to believe that overpopulation is a serious problem and some question the fairness of what they feel amount to subsidies for having children, such as the Earned Income Tax Credit (US), free K–12 education paid for by all taxpayers, family medical leave, and other such programs.
Others, however, do not believe overpopulation to be a problem in itself; regarding such problems as overcrowding, global warming, and straining food supplies to be problems of public policy and/or technology.

Some have argued that this sort of conscientiousness is self-eliminating (assuming it is heritable), so by avoiding reproduction for ethical reasons the childfree will only aid in the deterioration of concern for the environment and future generations.

Government and taxes

Some regard governmental or employer-based incentives offered only to parents—such as a per-child income tax credit, preferential absence planning, employment legislation, or special facilities—as intrinsically discriminatory, arguing for their removal, reduction, or the formation of a corresponding system of matching incentives for other categories of social relationships. Childfree advocates argue that other forms of caregiving have historically not been considered equal—that "only babies count"—and that this is an outdated idea that is in need of revision. Caring for sick, disabled, or elderly dependents entails significant financial and emotional costs but is not currently subsidized in the same manner. This commitment has traditionally and increasingly fallen largely on women, contributing to the feminization of poverty in the U.S.

The focus on personal acceptance is mirrored in much of the literature surrounding choosing not to reproduce. Many early books were grounded in feminist theory and largely sought to dispel the idea that womanhood and motherhood were necessarily the same thing, arguing, for example, that childfree people face not only social discrimination but political discrimination as well.

Religion
Abrahamic religions such as Judaism, Christianity, and Islam place a high value on children and their central place in marriage. In numerous works, including an Apostolic letter written in 1988, Pope John Paul II has set forth the Roman Catholic emphasis on the role of children in family life. However, the Catholic Church also stresses the value of chastity.

There are, however, some debates within religious groups about whether a childfree lifestyle is acceptable. Another view, for example, is that the biblical verse "Be fruitful and multiply" in Genesis 1:28, is really not a command but an expression of blessing. Alternatively, some Christians believe that Genesis 1:28 is a moral command but nonetheless believe that voluntary childlessness is ethical if a higher ethical principle intervenes to make child bearing imprudent in comparison. Health concerns, a calling to serve orphans, serving as missionaries in a dangerous location, etc., are all examples that would make childbearing imprudent for a Christian. A small activist group, the Cyber-Church of Jesus Christ Childfree, defends this view, saying "Jesus loved children but chose to never have any, so that he could devote his life to telling the Good News."

Ethical reasons

Essayist Brian Tomasik cites ethical reasons for people to remain childfree. Also, they will have more time to focus on themselves, which will allow for greater creativity and the exploration of personal ambitions. In this way, they may benefit themselves and society more than if they had a child.

The "selfish" issue
Some opponents of the childfree choice consider such a choice to be selfish. The rationale of this position is the assertion that raising children is a very important activity and so not engaging in this activity must therefore mean living one's life in service to one's self. The value judgment behind this idea is that individuals should endeavor to make some kind of meaningful contribution to the world, but also that the best way to make such a contribution is to have children. For some people, one or both of these assumptions may be true, but others prefer to direct their time, energy, and talents elsewhere, in many cases toward improving the world that today's children occupy (and that future generations will inherit).

Proponents of childfreedom posit that choosing not to have children is no more or less selfish than choosing to have children. Choosing to have children may be the more selfish choice, especially when poor parenting risks creating many long term problems for both the children themselves and society at large. As philosopher David Benatar explains, at the heart of the decision to bring a child into the world often lies the parents' own desires (to enjoy child-rearing or perpetuate one's legacy/genes), rather than the potential person's interests. At the very least, Benatar believes this illustrates why a childfree person may be just as altruistic as any parent.

There is also the question as to whether having children really is such a positive contribution to the world in an age when there are many concerns about overpopulation, pollution and depletion of non-renewable resources. This is especially true for the wealthy 1% of global population who consume disproportionate amounts of resources and who are responsible for 15% of global carbon emissions. Some critics counter that such analyses of having children may understate its potential benefits to society (e.g. a greater labor force, which may provide greater opportunity to solve social problems) and overstate the costs. That is, there is often a need for a non-zero birth rate.

Stigma
People who express the fact that they have voluntarily chosen to remain childless are frequently subjected to several forms of discrimination. The decision not to have children has been attributed to insanity or derided as "unnatural", and frequently childfree people are subjected to unsolicited questioning by friends, family, colleagues, acquaintances and even strangers who attempt to force them to justify and change their decision. Some British childfree women have compared their experiences of coming out as childfree to coming out as gay in the mid-20th century. Some Canadian women preferred not to express their decision to remain childless for fear of encountering social pressure to change their decision. Some women are told to first have a child before being able to properly decide that they do not want one. Some parents try to pressure their children into producing grandchildren and threaten to or actually disown them if they do not. Some childfree women are told they would make good mothers, or just "haven't met the right man yet", are assumed to be infertile rather than having made a conscious decision not to make use of their fertility (whether applicable or not). Some childfree people are accused of hating all children instead of just not wanting any themselves and still being able to help people who do have children with things like babysitting.

It has also been claimed that there is a taboo on discussing the negative aspects of pregnancy, and a taboo on parents to express regret that they chose to have children, which makes it harder for childfree people to defend their decision not to have them.

Social attitudes about voluntarily childlessness have been slowly changing from condemnation and pathologisation in the 1970s towards more acceptance by the 2010s.

Organizations and political activism
Childfree individuals do not necessarily share a unified political or economic philosophy, and most prominent childfree organizations tend to be social in nature. Childfree social groups first emerged in the 1970s and 1980s, most notable among them the National Alliance for Optional Parenthood and No Kidding! in North America where numerous books have been written about childfree people and where a range of social positions related to childfree interests have developed along with political and social activism in support of these interests. The term "childfree" was used in a July 3, 1972 Time article on the creation of the National Organization for Non-Parents. It was revived in the 1990s when Leslie Lafayette formed a later childfree group, the Childfree Network.

The Voluntary Human Extinction Movement (VHEMT, pronounced 'vehement') is an environmental movement that calls for all people to abstain from reproduction to cause the gradual voluntary extinction of humankind. Despite its name, the movement also includes those who do not necessarily desire human extinction but do want to curb or reverse human population growth in the name of environmentalism. VHEMT was founded in 1991 by Les U. Knight, an American activist who became involved in the American environmental movement in the 1970s and thereafter concluded that human extinction was the best solution to the problems facing the Earth's biosphere and humanity. VHEMT supports human extinction primarily because, in the movement's view, it would prevent environmental degradation. The movement states that a decrease in the human population would prevent a significant amount of human-caused suffering. The extinctions of non-human species and the scarcity of resources required by humans are frequently cited by the movement as evidence of the harm caused by human overpopulation.

The movement has been equated with extremism in Russia, and its founder, Edward Lisovskii, is under persecution.

In popular culture
The novel Olive (2020) by Emma Gannon includes several voluntarily childless characters.
One character from the television series True Detective (2014–19) upholds the anti-natalist philosophy.

See also

 Abortion-rights movements
 Antinatalism
 John B. Calhoun#Mouse experiments
 Criticism of marriage
 DINK
 Individual action on climate change
 Fertility and intelligence
 Population ageing

Antonyms
 Natalism
 Parent
 Quiverfull

References

Further reading

External links

 
 Reason.com – Why are People Having Fewer Kids?
 

Antinatalism
Social movements
Demographic economics
Childfree